Faustino may refer to:

Faustino (name), including a list of people with the name
Faustino (platform), a physical computing platform
Faustino, an ape in the Kasakela chimpanzee community
Bodegas Faustino vineyard in the Rioja region of Spain, and wines produced from this vineyard

See also
 Faustina (disambiguation)